John Burke is a bronze sculpture depicting the American politician of the same name by Avard Fairbanks, installed at the United States Capitol's National Statuary Hall, in Washington, D.C., as part of the National Statuary Hall Collection. The statue was gifted by the U.S. state of North Dakota in 1963.

See also
 1963 in art

References

External links

 

1963 establishments in Washington, D.C.
1963 sculptures
Bronze sculptures in Washington, D.C.
Monuments and memorials in Washington, D.C.
Burke, John
Sculptures by Avard Fairbanks
Sculptures of men in Washington, D.C.
Governor of North Dakota